The 1930 State of the Union Address was given by the 31st United States president, Herbert Hoover, on Tuesday, December 2, 1930. Soon the Great Depression began, and many people became poor. It was his second State of the Union Address to the 71st United States Congress. Key passages:
"During the past 12 months, we have suffered from other nations from economic depression."
"The origins of this depression lie to some extent within our own borders, through a speculative period which diverted capital and energy into speculation rather than constructive enterprise. Had over-speculation in securities been the only force operating, we should have seen recovery many months ago, as these particular dislocations have generally readjusted themselves."

References

State of the Union addresses
Presidency of Herbert Hoover
71st United States Congress
State of the Union Address
State of the Union Address
State of the Union Address
State of the Union Address
December 1930 events
State of the Union